Taner Yıldız (born 3 April 1962 in Devecipınar, Boğazlıyan, Yozgat Province) is a Turkish politician. He is a member of the Justice and Development Party and served as the Minister of Energy and Natural Resources between 2009 and 2015.

Taner Yıldız graduated from the Istanbul Technical University as an electrical engineer and worked for the Kayseri Electricity Generation Company.  He was elected to the Parliament in 2002. Yıldız served as an energy adviser to the prime minister Recep Tayyip Erdoğan. On 1 May 2009, after a reshuffle of the cabinet, he took the post of Minister of Energy and Natural Resources.

Yıldız is married and has four children.

References

Citations
Turkish Energy Minister to visit Azerbaijan, Trend (English), 01/20/2011, retrieved 01/20/2011.
Iran eyes Europe gas market through Turkey, Trend, (English), 01/09/2011, retrieved 01/20/2011.
Turkish energy minister due to Iran, Trend (English), 01/07/2011, retrieved 01/20/2011.
Turkey in talks with France over nuclear plant, Trend (English), 01/07/2011, retrieved 01/20/2011.
Turkey and Japan sign Memorandum of Understanding on construction of nuclear power plant, Trend (English), 12/25/2010, retrieved 01/20/2011.
Minister: Turkey paid about $1 billion for Azerbaijani gas from Shah Deniz, Trend (English), 12/24/2010, retrieved 01/20/2011.
Energy minister of Georgia and Turkey to discuss electricity transmission line, Trend (English), 12/12/2010, retrieved 01/20/2011.
Minister: Turkey determined to continue oil, gas trade with Iran, Trend (English), 10/02/2010, retrieved 01/20/2011.

Living people
1954 births
Deputies of Kayseri
Justice and Development Party (Turkey) politicians
People from Boğazlıyan
Ministers of Energy and Natural Resources of Turkey
Members of the 24th Parliament of Turkey
Members of the 23rd Parliament of Turkey
Members of the 22nd Parliament of Turkey
Members of the 26th Parliament of Turkey
Members of the 60th government of Turkey